"Movin' On Without You" is a song recorded by Japanese–American singer and producer Hikaru Utada taken from their debut studio album First Love (1999). The song was written, composed and produced by Utada themself, and became their first ever single to have been done by them. "Movin' On Without You" was written, produced and composed while Utada was attending college in Tokyo, Japan, during 1997. Utada, who received a record contract by Toshiba-EMI, had written an English-language version of the song, but the song remains unreleased.

Musically, the song utilizes dance-oriented music from the mid-1990s and also incorporates the use of R&B music from the parent album and house music. Lyrically, the song talks about an independent woman who can deal outside of a relationship. The song received favorable reception from most music critics, who praised the musical arrangement and praised Utada's vocals and songwriting. Some have even dubbed the song as a "J-Pop classic" and view it as a memorable song in Japanese music. An accompanying music video was shot for the single, which featured Utada on a chair in a computer lab and dancing to the song.

Commercially, the song was successful in their native Japan. Both released as an 8 cm and normal compact disc, the song peaked at number five and number one on the Oricon Singles Chart, with the latter format becoming their first number-one single in Japan. To date, the song is their fifth-best selling physical single with over 1.22 million units sold in the country. "Movin' On Without You" has been played live on several occasions including their 2006 tour Utada United 2006.

Background
Born and raised in Manhattan, New York City, Hikaru Utada had started singing at a very young age; they was a member of U3, a musical act with their mother Keiko Fuji and their father Teruzane. U released their debut album Star in 1993, with the hope to debut in America; the album failed to gain any recognition or chart positions. Utada's mother was a Japanese enka singer and actress, who released several albums with some topping the Oricon charts during the 1960s and 1970s period, while their father was a Japanese record producer who had contributed to some of Fuji's work. In 1996, the group was rebranded as Cubic U, an R&B project that focused primarily on Hikaru, resulting in the English language album Precious in 1998 with record label Toshiba EMI.

Utada had moved to their father's native Tokyo in 1997 to attend Seisen International School and later American School in Japan. During this time, Utada had signed solely with Toshiba EMI and started recording their singles and eventually their then-forthcoming album First Love. Utada, who was fluent in English, was asked if they could write Japanese songs by their record company, Toshiba EMI rather than English language lyrics. This led to the recording sessions for their debut Japanese album, First Love (1999). During the process of the tracks and album, Utada desired to become a singer-songwriter and occasionally practiced producing and composing their music rather than become a Japanese idol. For this, Utada released their first A-side single "Automatic/Time will tell", which peaked at number two on the Oricon chart and sold over two million units, becoming their best selling single to date.

Composition
"Movin' On Without You" was written, composed and produced by Utada themself, which became their first ever single to have been done by them. Their father, Teruzane, had co-produced and co-composed a lot of songs from Utada's first album First Love, but this song was the only track on the album to have not been produced by their father or Akira Miyake. The song was programmed, arranged, engineered and organized by Shinichiro Murayama, who also played keyboard and the synthesizer on the track while the intro and chorus guitar notes are played and written by Yoshiaki Kusaka. The song's recording demos and programming were in Tokyo, Japan with Utada recordings all from them, and Utada was assisted by Motoyama Seiji and Ugajin Masaaki.

Musically, "Movin' On Without You" is a disco and house track that was influenced by the early 1990s dance music throughout the Western part of the world and lasts a total of four minutes and forty-one seconds. The song also incorporates dance-oriented R&B rhythms that were present on their previous single and the parent album and contains more "fresh" and "comfortable" vocal abilities that are delivered by Utada. CDJournal felt that the song fit as one of the introduction tracks to make the album more "mellow".

Reception
"Movin' On Without You" received critical acclaim from most contemporary music critics who reviewed the track. David Jeffries from AllMusic, who wrote the extended biography of the singer, highlighted the song (viewed as [Untranslated song]) as one of Utada's career and parent album standouts. A reviewer from the online publication CDJournal was positive towards the song, calling it a "speedy dance beat" and praised their lyrical content and vocal delivery for being quite "persuasive" and challenging for a fifteen-year-old. the song had a tie-in as the Japanese CM song for the Nissan Terrano. At the 2000 Japan Gold Disc awards, they awarded the song along with "Time Will Tell" and "Automatic" for their own special Songs of the Year award.

Commercially, the song proved to be another consecutive success. Because the single was released on the 8 cm format, it served it as the primary charting format. The song debuted at number five on the Oricon Weekly Chart with estimated 473,530 sales in its first week. This charted lower than their previous single "Automatic" which peaked at number four in its first week. The song lowered in its positioning and eventually stayed on the charts for twelve weeks in total which was lower than their previous single's chart duration. Then, not long after, the song was re-released by Toshiba-EMI and was released as a standard compact disc. In its first week, the song debuted at number one, which became their first number-one single on Oricon and their second single to peak inside the top three. The song stayed in the chart for thirteen weeks and sold over 800,000 units in its re-release.

In April 1999, the song was certified million by the Recording Industry Association of Japan (RIAJ) for shipments of a million units in Japan, which became their second consecutive million selling single there. To date, "Movin' On Without You" has sold over 1.22 million units in Japan, which became their second best selling single of all time, just behind their debut single and was listed as one of the best selling singles in Japan. Following the success of their million selling singles, this effort was followed by "Addicted to You", "Wait & See (Risk)", "For You", "Time Limit", "Can You Keep a Secret?" from Distance, "Travelling" from Deep River and "Colors" from Ultra Blue.

Promotion
It had a tie-in as the Japanese CM song for the Nissan Terrano. An accompanying music video was shot for the single, which featured Utada on a chair in a computer lab seeing images including flowers, waves and other digitally enhanced images. It also intercuts to their dancing to the song in a laboratory. It was later included in their Utada Hikaru Single Clip Collection Vol. 1 (1999) music clip collection.

The song has been a constant feature of their live concert set lists. They performed the song during their Luv Live concerts in April 1999, as well as their Bohemian Summer 2000 concert tour and at the Utada Hikaru Unplugged event on August 10, 2001. The song was a part of their Hikaru no 5 residency concerts at the Nippon Budokan in February 2004, their Japan-wide tour Utada United 2006, their overseas tour Utada: In the Flesh 2010 and their December 2010 Wild Life concert series.

Alternative usage

Ayumi Hamasaki version

In November 2014, Universal Music Japan announced that there would be a tribute album to Utada's musical works, with their songs covered by a variety of musicians. During the time of the announcement, however, no specific artists were mentioned and this caused public speculation. It was then announced through AramaJapan.com that the artists had been unveiled for the project, which included Hamasaki. When the track list was announced, it was revealed that Hamasaki had covered "Movin' on Without You" and the song was uploaded to iTunes.

Hamasaki's version was produced by American producer and his team RedOne, who had collaborated with Hamasaki on their track "XOXO" from their 2014 album Colours. The song's composition removes the traditional dance house music from Utada's version and creates a more modern electronic dance music "twist". Villa commented "She's no stranger to the dance floor and easily finds their footing among the beats. The queens of J-Pop collide on this sleek remake." Eventually, the song was released as a promotional single from the compilation album on December 9, 2014, by Universal Japan.

The cover version received favorable reception from most music critics. Bradley Stern from MuuMuse was particularly positive towards the collaboration, stating "Happily, the result sounds exactly like something you might expect to hear on one of Ayu's Ayu-mi-x Euro-dance compilations. It's surging, non-stop nostalgic throwback — for both artists involved, really." Because Hamasaki's version was released only as a digital download, it was ineligible to chart on the Oricon Singles Chart, but charted on the Japan Billboard charts. The song peaked at number thirty-six on the Japan Hot 100 chart.

Commercials and other versions
During the release of the single, it had a tie-in as the Japanese CM song for the Nissan Terrano, which became their first commercial singles for the advert. A demo version of the single was featured on Utada's 15th anniversary album First Love; "Automatic" still remains unreleased.

Track listing

Charts
Japan (Oricon)

Notes

References

1999 singles
1999 songs
Hikaru Utada songs
Oricon Weekly number-one singles
Songs used as jingles
Songs written by Hikaru Utada
Disco songs
Dance-pop songs